Berkshire and Eastern Railroad (B&E) is a shortline railroad in New England and New York, using tracks owned by Pan Am Southern. Pan Am Southern is jointly owned by CSX Transportation (CSXT) and Norfolk Southern Railway (NS).

Following CSXT's purchase of Pan Am Systems, CSXT and NS chose Genesee & Wyoming (GWI) to operate Pan Am Southern. GWI, in turn, selected its Pittsburg and Shawmut Railroad (PSR) subsidiary to operate Pan Am Southern. PSR — doing business as Berkshire & Eastern — will operate, maintain, and market the Pan Am Southern freight rail lines previously operated by Pan Am Railways. 

Surface Transportation Board approval of the formation and operation of B&E was contingent on the Board's approval of CSXT's purchase of Pan Am Systems. The Board approved the CSXT–Pan Am deal on April 14, 2022. A start date for B&E operation of Pan Am Southern has not yet been set.

References

Vermont railroads
Massachusetts railroads
New York (state) railroads
Connecticut railroads
Genesee & Wyoming
Railway companies established in 2022
Norfolk Southern Railway
Spin-offs of Pan Am Railways
CSX Transportation